The  Children’s Railway is a pedal train attraction in the Efteling amusement park.

History 

The track was introduced in 1954 under the name Pedal Trains (Dutch: Traptreintjes) in the northern section of the park.
The concept was developed by Peter Reijnders, who wanted to create a world where children could ride through, including a farm with corn fields, a pond, the railway station The Blue Heron (Dutch: de Blauwe Reiger) and a level crossing. The guard at this crossing is modeled after Reijnders. The original braking system in the station caused quite some accidents as it was quite abrupt.

In 2000 the ride was moved to the eastern side of the ornamental pond and renamed Children Railway (Dutch: Kinderspoor)

Ride details 

 Ride length: 2 minutes
 Ride capacity: 750 passengers/ hour
 The trains are named after bird species
 During Winter Efteling the Children’s Railway is transformed into the langlauf track the Panting Deer (Dutch:  't Hijgend Hert).

See also 
Children's Railway (disambiguation)

References 

Efteling